Robert Daniel Cardona (born March 7, 1930) is an American television writer, producer, director and animator. He co-founded Clearwater Features, along with David Mitton, in 1980.

Career
Cardona has been based in the United Kingdom for much of his career. His best-known work is with his working partner David Mitton; their productions include Thomas the Tank Engine & Friends, which Cardona produced until 1986 (the second series), and Tugs, which ran for 13 episodes.

Cardona has also worked on other British TV series such as The Flaxton Boys, The Four Feathers, Thriller, Fraud Squad, Crime of Passion, Emmerdale and Virgin of the Secret Service. In the early 1990s, he moved to Canada, where he worked on the children's series Theodore Tugboat, which served as A Continuation of Tugs as a director. He also provided the Tugs footage for the American children's animated series Salty's Lighthouse. After Theodore Tugboat ended, Cardona went back to the UK and has lived there ever since.

Personal life
Cardona was married to English filmmaker, former actress and television writer Gloria Tors of whom they have worked together on The Flaxton Boys and Emmerdale. They have one son named Tarquin. Tors wrote the very first episode of Tugs whilst their son also wrote two episodes: "Pirate" and "Quarantine".

References

External links

1930 births
20th-century American writers
Animators from California
American company founders
American expatriate writers in Canada
American expatriates in the United Kingdom
American television directors
American television writers
American male television writers
American animated film directors
American animated film producers
Living people
Television producers from California
20th-century Canadian male writers
Screenwriters from California